John Henry Hamline (1856–1904) was a prominent Chicago lawyer.

Biography

John H. Hamline was born in Rotterdam, New York in 1856.  He was educated at Northwestern University, graduating in 1875.  He then attended Columbia Law School and graduated in 1877.

After law school, Hamline began practicing law in Evanston, Illinois where he was elected as village attorney several times.  He married Josephine Meade of Norwich, New York in 1880.  In 1883, he moved to Chicago.  He was elected to the Chicago City Council in 1887 as alderman for the Third Ward, holding that position until 1889.

Hamline served as president of the Chicago Bar Association and, in 1896–1897, of the Illinois State Bar Association.  He was also president of the Union League Club.

Hamline died on February 14, 1904.

John H. Hamline Elementary School in Chicago is named in his honor.

References

1856 births
1904 deaths
Illinois lawyers
Northwestern University alumni
Columbia Law School alumni
Chicago City Council members
People from Rotterdam, New York
19th-century American politicians